The Sylvester Medal is a bronze medal awarded by the Royal Society (London) for the encouragement of mathematical research, and accompanied by a £1,000 prize. It was named in honour of James Joseph Sylvester, the Savilian Professor of Geometry at the University of Oxford in the 1880s, and first awarded in 1901, having been suggested by a group of Sylvester's friends (primarily Raphael Meldola) after his death in 1897. Initially awarded every three years with a prize of around £900, the Royal Society have announced that starting in 2009 it will be awarded every two years instead, and is to be aimed at 'early to mid career stage scientist' rather than an established mathematician. The award winner is chosen by the Society's A-side awards committee, which handles physical rather than biological science awards.

, 45 medals have been awarded, of which all but 10 have been awarded to citizens of the United Kingdom, two to citizens of France and United States, and one medal each has been won by citizens of New Zealand, Germany, Austria, Russia, Italy, Sweden and South Africa.  three women have won the medal, Mary Cartwright in 1964, Dusa McDuff in 2018, and Frances Kirwan in 2021.

List of recipients

See also

 List of mathematics awards

References

External links 
Royal Society: Sylvester Medal

Awards of the Royal Society
Mathematics awards
Triennial events
Awards established in 1901
1901 in science